Claudia Kohde-Kilsch and Helena Suková were the defending champions but lost in the first round to Isabelle Demongeot and Nathalie Tauziat.

Lori McNeil and Betsy Nagelsen won in the final 6–4, 3–6, 6–4 against Larisa Savchenko and Natasha Zvereva.

Seeds
Champion seeds are indicated in bold text while text in italics indicates the round in which those seeds were eliminated.

 Claudia Kohde-Kilsch /  Helena Suková (first round)
 Gigi Fernández /  Robin White (quarterfinals)
 Lori McNeil /  Betsy Nagelsen (champions)
 Larisa Savchenko /  Natasha Zvereva (final)

Draw

References
 1988 Virginia Slims of Chicago Doubles Draw

Ameritech Cup
1988 WTA Tour
Virgin
1988 in sports in Illinois